Men Going Their Own Way (MGTOW ) is an anti-feminist, misogynistic, mostly-online community advocating for men to separate themselves from women and from a society which they believe has been corrupted by feminism. The community is a part of the manosphere, a collection of anti-feminist websites and online communities that also includes the men's rights movement, incels, and pickup artists. 

Like other manosphere communities, MGTOW overlaps with the alt-right and white supremacist movements, and it has been implicated in online harassment of women. The Southern Poverty Law Center categorizes MGTOW as a part of the male supremacist ideology.

History 
While it is not clear where the MGTOW ideology originated, it is believed to have emerged in the early 2000s. A blog called No Ma'am was one of the first sites dedicated to the ideology, publishing a "MGTOW Manifesto" in 2001. Earlier members of MGTOW were largely libertarian. There is a divide between early and contemporary members of MGTOW, with some earlier members expressing derision for the present-day MGTOW community. Online MGTOW forums have included the subreddit r/MGTOW, created in 2011, smaller auxiliary subreddits, and the MGTOW Forum, an independent website that emerged in 2014. Following Reddit's 2017 ban of a large incel subreddit, r/MGTOW was briefly the largest and most active manosphere forum on the site. 

MGTOW and other manosphere communities overlap with various white supremacist, authoritarian, and populist movements worldwide, such as the alt-right which came to prominence around 2015. MGTOW and the alt-right overlap both in membership and in ideology; both believe that feminism has destroyed Western society. Far-right commentator and polemicist Milo Yiannopoulos is credited with helping to popularize MGTOW with a 2014 Breitbart article titled "The Sexodus", in which he described men who were eschewing women, love, sex, and marriage because of feminism.

Researchers have implicated MGTOW communities in online harassment of women. In January 2020, a group of computer scientists published a preprint of a paper titled "The Evolution of the Manosphere Across the Web"; r/MGTOW and the MGTOW Forum were among the online communities which the authors said "have been growing in size and in their involvement in online harassment and real-world violence." The paper was described in MIT Technology Review as "the most complete picture yet of the misogynistic groups that fuel the incel movement online" and in Der Spiegel as "the most comprehensive attempt yet to analyze the manosphere online". Shortly after publication, Reddit quarantined r/MGTOW, a restriction the platform applies to subreddits determined to be "extremely offensive or upsetting to the average redditor" which prevents them from earning advertising revenue and requires visitors to agree to seeing potentially offensive content before entering. r/MGTOW was banned in August 2021 for breaking the site's policies against promotion of violence and hate.

On October 6 2022, Global News reported that there were hidden tags labeled "#mgtow" in videos uploaded by the team-managed YouTube channel of Canadian Opposition leader, Pierre Poilievre, since March 2018. Poilievre said he immediately had his team remove the tags as soon as he was made aware of them, when questioned about MGTOW Poilievre stated "I condemn this organization" and "we on this side reject all misogyny and all acts of extremism, and that is how we will always conduct ourselves over here".

Membership 
Members of MGTOW communities are primarily heterosexual, white, middle-class men from North America and Europe. Unlike some other manosphere groups, MGTOW is exclusively male. MGTOW often disavow hierarchies and claim to be leaderless; some deny that MGTOW is a group or movement at all, instead emphasizing each member's individuality and independence within a collective. Researcher Callum Jones and colleagues write in New Media & Society that "while the precise number of MGTOW followers is unclear, it appears to be a popular and growing group within the Manosphere: the subreddit r/MGTOW has grown from 54,000 members in early 2018 to 104,000 members in early 2019 and there are 32,859 members listed on one MGTOW forum." Author Donna Zuckerberg described MGTOW in her 2018 book Not All Dead White Men as smaller than the men's human rights movement and the seduction (pickup artistry) communities, with the MGTOW Forum having over 25,000 subscribers and r/MGTOW having over 35,000.

Ideology 
At the center of MGTOW ideology is the notion of male separatism and the belief that society has been corrupted by feminism. MGTOW groups are misogynist and anti-feminist, believing that feminism has made women dangerous to men, and that male self-preservation requires dissociating completely from women. They believe there is systemic gynocentric bias against men, including double standards in gender roles and bias against men in family courts. MGTOW groups share a belief common among other manosphere groups that women follow a similar pattern in dating and marriage: young and attractive women are promiscuous and engage in "hypergamy", having sex with numerous men and abandoning a man if a "higher-value" man shows interest. They believe women gravitate towards "alpha men" who are attractive but mistreat them, reinforcing the ideology of feminism. According to MGTOW, as women begin to age, they settle down with "beta males" who provide for them financially, but to whom they deny sex, sometimes engaging in extramarital sex with more attractive men; these relationships ultimately lead to divorce, in which the women will be favored by the courts due to what MGTOW call female privilege.

Scott Wright and colleagues at Monash University write that "MGTOW propagate extensive and wide-ranging passive or undirected harassment and misogyny on Twitter." Fellows at the Institute for Research on Male Supremacism publishing with the International Centre for Counter-Terrorism have said that members of MGTOW "openly disdain women, and normalize it through online harassment." The Southern Poverty Law Center categorizes MGTOW as a part of the male supremacist ideology, a category they began tracking on their hate group tracking project, Hate Map, in 2018.

Men in the MGTOW community use jargon shared by the broader manosphere, including the red pill and blue pill metaphor borrowed from the film The Matrix. Those in the manosphere who have been awakened from feminist "delusion" to the supposed reality that society is fundamentally misandrist and dominated by feminist values are said to be "redpilled" or have "taken the red pill"; those who do not accept that ideology are referred to as "bluepilled". Other jargon includes pejorative terms for other men such as "beta", "cuck", "soy boy", and "white knight".

Members of MGTOW communities track their engagement with the ideology on a series of four levels. At the first level, men believe they are used and manipulated by women (called "situational awareness" or the "red pill") but still believe in the value of marriage; they are sometimes described as "purple pilled". At the second level, men reject long-term relationships, cohabitation, and marriage, but will still participate in shorter term relationships and sexual encounters. At the third level, men reject short-term relationships and limit their interactions with women. At the fourth level, men minimize their engagement with the state and society, including employment; this is called "going ghost".

Relation to other manosphere groups 

The MGTOW community is a part of the manosphere, a heterogeneous group of websites, blogs, and online forums promoting some forms of masculinity, hostility towards women, strong opposition to feminism, and exaggerated misogyny. In addition to MGTOW, the men's rights movement, incels, pick-up artists, and father's rights movements also make up the manosphere.

Men's rights movement 

Although some consider MGTOW to be a part of the men's rights movement, others have cited MGTOW's separatist ideology as distinguishing them from the men's rights movement, which engages in activism to try to drive societal change. According to Donna Zuckerberg, early MGTOW groups were primarily libertarian and opposed to "big government"; this led to a rift with the men's rights movements who wished to lobby for governmental change, particularly with regards to custody and divorce law.

Pickup artistry 

The MGTOW community has a reciprocal disdain for pickup artists (PUAs) due to their differing opinions towards women. Whereas MGTOW focuses on separating entirely from women, pickup artists focus on developing techniques to have sex with women. PUA communities have mocked MGTOW as "Virgins Going Their Own Way". MGTOW communities deride PUAs as being entirely dependent on women's approval, and because they place so much value in attaining sexual success with women, MGTOW says PUA communities contribute to what they see as overvaluing of women in gynocentric society.

Explanatory notes

Citations

Works cited

Further reading

External links 
 

Alt-right
Celibacy
Criticism of feminism
Criticism of marriage
Internet culture
Manosphere
Masculinity
Men and feminism
Men's movement
Men's rights
Misogyny
Opposition to feminism
/pol/ phenomena 
Sexual attraction
Social issues